TV Rogers is the French-language sister station of Rogers TV, with a network of five stations in Ontario and New Brunswick, Canada.

Programming

New Brunswick
Rogers offers French-language community channels in Edmundston, Bathurst, the Acadian Peninsula and Moncton.  The programming shown on Rogers TV channels is a mix of access programming produced by the general public, and licensee programming originating from Rogers staff.  Topics include political programming, sports coverage, live bingo shows, entertainment series, election coverage, telethons, municipal council coverage, documentaries and specials. In 2015, some cartoons discontinued from this channel, but reappeared on this channel since 2017, starting with The ZhuZhus (Frankie et les ZhuZhu Pets in French). Since January 2019, some cartoons have been completely discontinued.

Stations

New Brunswick
 Bathurst Channel 9 
 Acadian Peninsula Channel 10
 Edmundston Channel 10
 Moncton Channel 9

Ontario
 Ottawa Channel 23

See also
 Rogers TV
 TV1 (Canada), a counterpart launched by Bell Media

External links
 TV Rogers 

Rogers Communications
Canadian community channels
French-language television networks in Canada
Analog cable television networks in Canada
 
Television channels and stations established in 1968

fr:TV Rogers